Brooke Neal (born 4 July 1992) is a New Zealand field hockey player who has played for the New Zealand national team.

Personal life
Neal attended Whangarei Girls' High School from 2006 to 2010 before studying communications at the University of Waikato. She graduated in 2013 as a Sir Edmund Hillary Scholar

Neal's brother, Shay, also represents New Zealand at hockey and attended the Rio Olympics. Their journey can be followed here 

Currently, Neal is an ambassador for the New Zealand Olympic Committee and has been visiting schools talking about her olympic experience.
She has also entered the corporate speaking circuit, where shares the lessons learned throughout her journey.

Playing career
Neal represented New Zealand at the 2013 Women's Hockey Junior World Cup, before making her national debut that same year.

She has competed in two World League finals, the most recent in 2015 where the team came second, Champions Trophy in 2016, and she represented New Zealand at the 2016 Summer Olympics where her team came fourth.
She participated at the  2020 Women's FIH Pro League.

References

External links
 

1992 births
Living people
New Zealand female field hockey players
Female field hockey defenders
Olympic field hockey players of New Zealand
Field hockey players at the 2016 Summer Olympics
Field hockey players at the 2018 Commonwealth Games
Commonwealth Games medallists in field hockey
Commonwealth Games gold medallists for New Zealand
University of Waikato alumni
People educated at Whangarei Girls' High School
Field hockey players from Whangārei
20th-century New Zealand women
21st-century New Zealand women
Medallists at the 2018 Commonwealth Games